Aleksander Knavs (born 5 December 1975) is a Slovenian former football defender.

Club career
Knavs was born in Maribor and started his professional career playing at the club Olimpija from the Slovenian capital city of Ljubljana in 1993. He played for Olimpija until June 1997 and went on to move abroad by signing with Austrian club Tirol Innsbruck after being noticed by Kurt Jara, the club's manager at the time. Playing for Olimpija, Knavs appeared in 70 domestic league matches and scored five goals for the club in the league. He also won the Slovenian championship twice with the club, in 1994 and 1995.

Knavs won two consecutive champions titles in the Austrian Bundesliga with Tirol Innsbruck in 2000 and 2001, before he went on to sign with German Bundesliga side 1. FC Kaiserslautern in July 2001. He played for Kaiserslautern in the next three seasons, appearing in 64 Bundesliga matches and scoring three goals for the club in the league before leaving it for another Bundesliga team, VfL Bochum, in June 2004. He spent only one season with Bochum and left the club after their relegation to the 2. Bundesliga at the end of the 2004–05 season, making 26 Bundesliga appearances and scoring one goal for the club in the league. He subsequently returned to Austria by signing with Red Bull Salzburg in July 2005. He stayed there three seasons, making 30 appearances and scoring one goal.

He retired from football in 2008, aged 32.

International career
Knavs went on to make his debut for the Slovenian national team playing as a substitute in the final ten minutes of their friendly match against Iceland on 5 February 1998 during an international friendly tournament in Cyprus. He became a regular in the Slovenian national team already during the same year and subsequently appeared in ten out of possible twelve matches in the qualifying session for the Euro 2000. He also managed to score one goal in the team's away match against Georgia that ended in a 1–1 draw. The Slovenian team surprisingly qualified for the finals after beating Ukraine 3–2 on aggregate in the play-offs. Knavs also appeared in two group matches at the final Euro 2000 tournament, playing as a substitute in the last 22 minutes of the second match against Spain as well as all 90 minutes in the final group match against Norway. With two points scored, Slovenia finished last out of four teams in their group and was eliminated from the tournament in the first round.

He continued to play for the Slovenian national team in the qualifying session for the 2002 World Cup, appearing in nine out of possible twelve qualifying matches and scoring one goal in the team's away match against Russia that ended in a 1–1 draw. Slovenia went on to qualify for their second consecutive major tournament after beating Romania 3–2 on aggregate in the play-offs. Knavs was also part of the Slovenian team at the 2002 World Cup finals and appeared in two group matches before the team was eliminated from the tournament in the first round by finishing last out of four teams in their group, scoring no points. He played the entire first match against Spain and was also a starting player in the second match against South Africa, but was substituted in the 60th minute.

With the Slovenian national team, he also appeared in seven out of possible ten matches in the qualifying session for the Euro 2004 and scored one goal in the team's 3–1 victory over Israel at home. The Slovenian team did not manage to qualify for the finals after being defeated 2–1 on aggregate by Croatia in the play-offs. He also appeared in seven out of possible ten matches in the qualifying session for the 2006 World Cup, where the Slovenian team finished only fourth in their group, behind Italy, Norway and Scotland.

He made his international comeback in August 2006 after ten months of absence from the national team, playing all 90 minutes in Slovenia's friendly match against Israel. His last match for national team was during qualifying campaign for the Euro 2008 in their first qualifier against Bulgaria, which they lost 3–0. In all, Knavs won  65 international caps and scored three goals for Slovenia. He occasionally captained his national side.

Career statistics

Club

International goals
Scores and results list Slovenia's goal tally first.

Honours
Olimpija
Slovenian Championship: 1993–94, 1994–95
Runner-up: 1995–96
Slovenian Cup: 1995–96

Tirol Innsbruck
Bundesliga: 1999–00, 2000–01
ÖFB-Cup:
Runner-up: 2001

Kaiserslautern
DFB-Pokal:
Runner-up: 2002–03

See also
Slovenian international players

References

External links
 
 
 Aleksander Knavs at NZS 
 

Living people
1975 births
Sportspeople from Maribor
Slovenian footballers
Association football defenders
Slovenian expatriate footballers
Slovenia under-21 international footballers
Slovenia international footballers
Slovenian PrvaLiga players
NK Olimpija Ljubljana (1945–2005) players
VfL Bochum players
1. FC Kaiserslautern players
FC Tirol Innsbruck players
FC Red Bull Salzburg players
Bundesliga players
Expatriate footballers in Germany
Slovenian expatriate sportspeople in Germany
Austrian Football Bundesliga players
Expatriate footballers in Austria
Slovenian expatriate sportspeople in Austria
UEFA Euro 2000 players
2002 FIFA World Cup players
Slovenia youth international footballers